The E9 European long distance path, E9 path or European Coastal Path (French: Sentier Européen du Littoral) is one of the European long-distance paths, running for 9.880 km from Tarifa, Spain to Narva-Jõesuu in Estonia. In 2019, the southern terminus was extended from Cabo de São Vicente in Portugal to Tarifa in Spain, the southern-most point of continental Europe, and also the starting point of E4 and E12.

Portugal 
The path follows the western coasts of Portugal from Cabo de São Vicente. There are also some sections around Lisbon and it's possible that the Camino Portuguese Coastal Way could also become the E9.

Spain 
The path follows the western coasts of Spain.

E9 often follows the GR footpaths in Spain.

France 
The path follows the northern and western coasts of France starting at Bray-Dunes on the Belgian border. The GR 120 runs from Dunkerque to Pas d'Authie, the GR 21 from Le Tréport to Le Havre, GR 223 from Le Havre via Cherbourg to Avranches where it divides into several smaller local trails. The GR 34 then continues from Mont St-Michel to Le Tour-du-Parc. The GR 8 re-starts the trail further south from Saint-Brevin-les-Pins to Sare in the Pyrenees incorporating a short coastal section of the GR 4.

England 
The path follows the southern coast to Plymouth in England, and then following the English south coast as far as Dover, where another ferry crossing returns the route to Calais in France. In England the path follows parts of the South West Coast Path, the Solent Way, the South Downs Way and the Saxon Shore Way paths. The British route itself includes an alternative route via the Isle of Wight.

Belgium 
The path then follows the coast of Belgium.

Netherlands 
The path follows the coast of the Netherlands. Here it follows the Dutch North Sea Trail, which includes 5 successive trails: 
from Sluis (border with Belgium) to Hook of Holland
Hook of Holland to Haarlem
Haarlem to Den Oever (there is an alternative route to Den Helder, but the European route continues along the Afsluitdijk)
Zurich to Lauwersoog
Lauwersoog to Bad Nieuweschans (the border with Germany).

Germany 

The path crosses the base of the Jutland peninsula, before following the coast of the Baltic Sea.

Poland 
 Braniewo to Żarnowiec,
  Coastal Trail, 
 Żarnowiec - Świnoujście.

Lithuania 
The Baltic Coastal Hiking is part of the long distance hiking route E9 along the Baltic Sea coast. In Lithuania, the trail is known as Jūrų takas and is 216 km long. The route takes about 10-12 days to walk and is divided into about 20 km long stages. The highest point of the trail in Lithuania is Curonian Spit. Other highlights along the route are the Nemunas Delta and Seaside regional parks, and the coastal resorts of Nida and Palanga. The trail is marked with white-blue-white signs on stones, trees, and other natural objects. See more here

Latvia 

The Baltic Coastal Hiking is part of the long distance hiking route E9 along the Baltic Sea coast. In Latvia, the trail is known as Jūrtaka and is 581 km long. The route takes about 30 days to walk and is divided into about 20 km long stages. Highlights along the route are the Slitere National Park, Kemeri National Park, and the coastal resort Jurmala. The trail is marked with white-blue-white signs on stones, trees, and other natural objects. See more here.

Estonia 

The Baltic Coastal Hiking is part of the long distance hiking route E9 along the Baltic Sea coast. In Estonia, the trail is known as Ranniku matkarada and is 622 km long. The route takes about 30 days to walk and is divided into about 20 km long stages. The highest point of the trail in Estonia is the Rannamõisa cliff. Other highlights along the route are Matsalu National Park, the coastal resorts of Pärnu and Haapsalu, and Western Estonian islands. The trail is marked with white-blue-white signs on stones, trees, and other natural objects. See more here and at the External Links below.

References

External links
 E9 on European Ramblers Association website
 Baltic Coastal Hiking publications
 Introduction to the E9
 Long Distance Walker's Association website.

Hiking trails in Portugal
Hiking trails in Spain
Hiking trails in France
Hiking trails in Germany
Hiking trails in Poland
Hiking trails in Russia
Coastal paths in the United Kingdom
European long-distance paths